The 2017 Östersunds FK season was the club's 22nd season of existence, and their second season in the top-tier of Swedish football. Östersunds FK competed in the Allsvenskan, the Svenska Cupen and the UEFA Europa League.

Background

Club

First team

Management

Transfers

In

Out

Loan in

Loan out

Competitions

Preseason

Allsvenskan

League table

Results

Svenska Cupen (2016–17)

Group stage

Table

Results

Knockout round

Svenska Cupen (2017–18)

Qualifying rounds

Group stage 

Group stage was played during the 2018 season.

UEFA Europa League (2017–18)

Second qualifying round

Third qualifying round

Play-off round

Group stage

Table

Results

Round of 32 
The round of 32 was played during the 2018 Östersunds FK season

References 

Östersunds FK
Östersunds FK seasons